Anti-aliasing may refer to any of a number of techniques to combat the problems of aliasing in a sampled signal such as a digital image or digital audio recording.

Specific topics in anti-aliasing include:

 Anti-aliasing filter, a filter used before a signal sampler, to restrict the bandwidth of a signal such as in audio applications
 Manual anti aliasing, artistic technique done in pixel art graphics to smooth transitions between shapes, to soften lines or to blur edges.
 Spatial anti-aliasing, the technique of minimizing aliasing when representing a high-resolution image at a lower resolution
 Fast approximate anti-aliasing, an anti-aliasing algorithm created by Timothy Lottes under Nvidia. May also be referred to as Fast Sample Anti-aliasing (FSAA).
 Multisample anti-aliasing, a type of spatial anti-aliasing method
 Morphological antialiasing, a type of spatial anti-aliasing method
 Conservative Morphological Anti-Aliasing, a type of spatial anti-aliasing method
 Supersampling, a type of spatial anti-aliasing method
 Temporal anti-aliasing, techniques to reduce or remove the effects of temporal aliasing in moving images
 Deep learning anti-aliasing, a type of spatial and temporal anti-aliasing method relying on dedicated tensor core processors

See also 
 Aliasing
 Pixel-art scaling algorithms
 Nyquist–Shannon sampling theorem

References